Richard Jenkyns (1782 – 16 March 1854) was a British academic administrator at the University of Oxford and Dean at Wells Cathedral.

Life
Jenkyns was born at Evercreech in Somerset, where he was baptised on 21 December 1782. He was the eldest son of John Jenkyns (1753-1824), prebendary of Wells, and his wife Jane, née Banister. He was appointed a Fellow of Balliol College, Oxford in 1802, a Tutor in 1813, Bursar in 1814, and Master from 23 April 1819 until his death in 1854. He was awarded a Master of Arts in 1806 and a Doctor of Divinity in 1819.
While Master at Balliol College, Jenkyns was also Vice-Chancellor of Oxford University from 1824 until 1828. He introduced open competition for scholarships and also raised the standard of Balliol College to the first rank at Oxford.
From 1845 to 1854, Jenkyns was also Dean of Wells.

References

Further reading
  Cannan, Edwin, ‘Jenkyns, Richard (1782–1854)’, rev. M. C. Curthoys, Oxford Dictionary of National Biography, 2004. 

1782 births
1854 deaths
Fellows of Balliol College, Oxford
Masters of Balliol College, Oxford
Vice-Chancellors of the University of Oxford
Deans of Wells
19th-century English Anglican priests